Daniela Ambrosoli (born in Ascona, November 10, 1941) is a Swiss entrepreneur, founder and president of the Pierino Ambrosoli Foundation, and film director.

Biography  
Daniela Ambrosoli, daughter of German dancer Sonja Bragowa and Italian entrepreneur Pierino Ambrosoli, from Lombardy, was born in Ascona, Switzerland. She attends schools in Ascona and Locarno, where she obtains the Swiss Confederation classical (Latin) matura. During the following years she studies and works in the fields of psychology and medicine in Florence, Zurich and Geneva.

After the premature death of her father, she learns management and takes over some of the companies that were founded by her father, amongst which the Camping Delta in Locarno in 1983, together with her husband Franz Marcacci, and the real estate company Amministrazioni Immobiliari Ambrosoli in Locarno. In 1999 she founds the Travel & Culture Management AG in Zurich. 
In 1990, Daniela Ambrosoli founds the Pierino Ambrosoli Foundation in Zurich, an organization that supports young talents from all over the world in their dance and music training.
 
In the following years Daniela Ambrosoli is engaged in numerous executive boards of international associations working active in the fields of dance, such as Prix de Lausanne, and music, as well as in humanitarian and social issues, e.g.  Soroptimist International Swiss Union.

As a result of her collaboration with the Italian film director Renato Pugina, together with two of her children, Aliocha Merker (cameraman and still photographer in Rome) and Shari Yantra Marcacci (photographer, film director and producer in Los Angeles), Daniela Ambrosoli gets in contact with the world of movies. Since 2004 she works with Renato Pugina as assistant director, organizer and translator of documentaries for the Radiotelevisione svizzera (RSI / Radio and Television of Italian Switzerland): "La Depressione, il male oscuro" (2004), "Sul corpo e nel cuore" (2007), "In un corpo sbagliato" (2009), "Madri figlicide" (2010), "L'ultimo viaggio" (2013), "I sopravvisuti" (2014), "Il sogno di Hans" (2015), "Via dal Ticino" (2015). Daniela is co-director with Renato Pugina for the documentary "Per Amor di Dio" (2011) RSI.

In 2008/2009, Daniela Ambrosoli realizes a documentary about Hermann Nitsch, the famous Austrian artist and founding father of the Viennese Actionism. Together with her team, including Aliocha Merker as cameraman and director of photography and Johannes Nakajima as editor, she accompanies Nitsch in his private life and life as an artist during a whole year, to then paint the poignant portrait of this extraordinary man. In 2011, the film "HN Hermann Nitsch" is awarded with the Audience Award for Best Documentary at the Beverly Hills Film Festival in Los Angeles.

"The Making of a Dream – Life as a Ballet Dancer" 2017 is a new documentary directed and produced by Daniela Ambrosoli. A cinematic essay about ballet, dance, young dancers and their lives. This documentary explores the difficult journey of discerning young people from the first steps in amateur dance schools to a career as the main dance performer in one of the world's most famous dance companies.

Many interviews were taken, with famous protagonists of the dance scene worldwide, such as the well-known dancer Etoile from The Scala in Milano, and Béjart's muse, Luciana Savignano and among others, with the Swiss actress Sabine Timoteo, a former dancer. The film crew visited several acclaimed companies and schools in Switzerland, The Netherlands, Italy, and in the USA Boston and New York.

From May 2018, "The Making of a Dream" was shown for six weeks at the Stüssihof Cinema in Zurich and is distributed worldwide by Taskovskifilms London. On November 11, 2018, the documentary "The Making of a Dream" was broadcast on the Ticino television channel RSI at 10.30 in the Paganini show. 

In 2021 she completes her newest documentary "papa & dada". The film follows the question: How does starting a family actually "work" as a couple of two men and what does everyday family life look like? What are the particular obstacles, which are the challenges? The documentary "papa & dada" follows up on these questions and transports us into the world of the famous ballet dancer John Lam and his husband lawyer John Ruggieri. In the biggest possible openness, the two of them tell their story and grant an intimate insight into their everyday family life with their sons Giovanni and Santino in Boston. Complemented by the experiences and stories of other same-sexual couples and other companions from different parts of the world, the film draws a lovingly and unbiased picture of a family life of two fathers and leads the viewers to question such things as: What are the differences in comparison to the normal family unit of father-mother-child? What are the similarities? What actually defines a family? Where do we really stand when it comes to the acceptance of same-sex families?

Filmography 
 papa & dada, 2021, documentary; director, screenplay, producer
 The Making of a Dream, 2017, documentary; director, screenplay, producer
 Figli? No grazie!, 2017, documentary RSI; assistant director, coordinator, translator
 Via dal Ticino, 2015, documentary RSI; assistant director, coordinator, translator
 Il sogno di Hans, 2015, documentary RSI; assistant director, coordinator, translator 
 I sopravvissuti, 2014, documentary RSI; assistant director, coordinator, translator 
 L'ultimo viaggio, 2013, documentary RSI; assistant director, coordinator, translator
 Per Amor di Dio, 2011, documentary RSI; co-director, coordinator, translator
 Der Fisch, short 2011 by Shari Yantra Marcacci; executive producer
 Madri figlicide, 2010, documentary RSI; assistant director, coordinator, translator 
 HN Hermann Nitsch, 2009, documentary; screenplay, director, co-production
 In un corpo sbagliato, 2009, documentary RSI; assistant director, coordinator, translator 
 Sul corpo e nel cuore, 2007, documentary RSI; assistant director, coordinator, translator 
 Depressione un male oscuro, 2004, documentary RSI; assistant director, coordinator, translator

Awards 
Documentary – The Making of a Dream:
 Official Selection « LA Femme International Film Festival 2017 »
 Winner Best Documentary « Utah Dance Film Festival 2018 »
 Winner Best Documentary « Austrian Independent Film Festival 2018 »
 Nominated Best Cinematography « Nice International Film Festival 2018 » channel RSI at 10.30 in show
 Semi-finalist « International Women's Film Festival », Orlando (US-FL)

Documentary – HN Hermann Nitsch:
 2011 Audience Choice Award – Best Documentary, the Beverly Hills Film Festival, Los Angeles

Documentary - papa&dada:
 2021 Finalist at Luleå International film festival, Sweden
 2022 "Nomination as Best Documentary" LGBTQ LOVE STORY FILM FESTIVAL London

External links 
 
 HN Hermann Nitsch – documentary
 papa & dada – documentary
 Pierino Ambrosoli Foundation
 Official website of Pierino Ambrosoli (father)
 Interview La Regione, in connection with the release of the official biography
 Interview Fluntemer, in connection with the release of the official biography

References 

Swiss film directors
Swiss women film directors
1941 births
Living people
Swiss philanthropists